Events in the year 2023 in the Solomon Islands.

Incumbents 

 Monarch: Charles III
 Governor-General: David Vunagi
 Prime Minister: Manasseh Sogavare

Events 
Ongoing — COVID-19 pandemic in Solomon Islands

 7 February – Police use tear gas to disperse protesters after the governor of Malaita province, Daniel Suidani, is ousted in a no-confidence vote. Suidani was one of the strongest critics of the government's approach to China.

References 

 
2020s in the Solomon Islands
Years of the 21st century in the Solomon Islands
Solomon Islands
Solomon Islands